Martin Palincsár (born 3 January 1999) is a Hungarian football player. He plays for MTK Budapest.

Club career
He made his NB I debut for MTK Budapest on 14 August 2020 in a game against Ferencváros.

Career statistics
.

References

External links

1999 births
Living people
People from Esztergom
Hungarian footballers
Hungary youth international footballers
Hungary under-21 international footballers
Association football midfielders
Budaörsi SC footballers
Monori SE players
MTK Budapest FC players
Nemzeti Bajnokság I players
Nemzeti Bajnokság II players
Sportspeople from Komárom-Esztergom County